David Valley is a small partially ice-free valley lying above the Conrow Glacier and east of Horowitz Ridge in the Asgard Range, Victoria Land. It was named by Roy E. Cameron, leader of a United States Antarctic Research Program biological party to the valley in 1967–68, for Charles N. David, a member of that party.

References
 

Valleys of Victoria Land
McMurdo Dry Valleys